Calumet Harbor is an unincorporated community in the town of Calumet, Fond du Lac County, Wisconsin, United States.

Calumet Light
Calumet Light, a lighthouse

Notes

Unincorporated communities in Fond du Lac County, Wisconsin
Unincorporated communities in Wisconsin